The South African Open is a chess tournament played in South Africa. It was first held in 1962.

History
First held in 1962, the SA Open was held every two years until 1995, after which it has been held annually. It was not held in 1992 due to the unification of the various sports bodies after apartheid.

Tournament winners

References

Chess competitions
Chess in South Africa
1962 in chess
Recurring sporting events established in 1962
1962 establishments in South Africa